Ukk may refer to:
 Ukk, a village in Hungary
 Nikolai Ukk (born 1980), Russian badminton player

UKK may refer to:

 Oskemen Airport (IATA airport identifier: UKK) in Oskemen (Ust-Kamenogorsk), Kazakhstan
 Ukkusissat Heliport (non-IATA location identifier: UKK), in Ukkusissat, Greenland
 Uppsala Konsert & Kongress, a concert hall and convention centre in Uppsala, Sweden
 Urho Kekkonen (1900–1986), Prime Minister of Finland, President of Finland
 Ultimate Kho Kho, an Indian kho-kho league